The blacklip abalone, Haliotis rubra, is an Australian species of large, edible sea snail, a marine gastropod mollusk in the family Haliotidae, the abalones.

Subspecies
 Haliotis rubra conicopora Péron, 1816 – the conical pore abalone; synonyms: Haliotis conicopora Péron, 1816 (original combination), Haliotis cunninghami Gray, 1826; Haliotis granti Pritchard & Gatliff, 1902; Haliotis vixlirata Cotton, 1943
 Haliotis rubra rubra Leach, 1814  the shield abalone;  synonyms: Haliotis ancile Reeve, 1846; Haliotis improbula Iredale, 1924; Haliotis naevosa Philippi, 1844; Haliotis ruber Leach, 1814 (original combination); Haliotis whitehousei (Colman, 1959); Sanhaliotis whitehousei Colman, 1959

Description
"The large, much depressed shell has a rounded-oval shape. The distance of the apex from the margin is one-fifth the length of the shell. It is sculptured with fine spiral  cords cut by close minute striae of increment. It shows radiating waves or folds above. A slight angle at the row of perforations, below it is broadly excavated and then  carinated. The about six perforations are elevated and circular. The outline is suborbicular, much depressed  and solid but not thick. The surface is either dark red with few radiating angular white patches, or dull red and green, streaked and mottled. The spiral cords of the outer surface are either nearly equal, or have slightly larger ones at wide intervals. They are decussated by close growth-striae. The whorls number a trifle over 3. Inside they are corrugated like the outer surface, silvery, and very brilliantly iridescent. The reflections are  chiefly sea-green and red. The columellar plate is broad, flat, and obliquely truncated at its base. The cavity of the spire is wide, open, but shallow

This is a variable form, in color varying from dark coral red to dull red streaked with pale green."

Distribution
This species is endemic to Australia, and is one of two species of abalone taken in South Australia and Tasmania (the other is the greenlip abalone).
Range is from Fremantle, Western Australia, to Angourie, New South Wales, and around Tasmania.

It is called the blacklip abalone because the edge of the foot is black.

References

 Wilson, B. 1993. Australian Marine Shells. Prosobranch Gastropods. Kallaroo, Western Australia : Odyssey Publishing Vol. 1 408 pp.
 Geiger, D.L. 2000 [1999]. Distribution and biogeography of the recent Haliotidae (Gastropoda: Vetigastropoda) world-wide. Bollettino Malacologico 35(5-12): 57-120
 Geiger D.L. & Poppe G.T. (2000). A Conchological Iconography: The family Haliotidae. Conchbooks, Hackenheim Germany. 135pp  83pls
 Geiger D.L. & Owen B. (2012) Abalone: Worldwide Haliotidae. Hackenheim: Conchbooks. viii + 361 pp.

External links
  New South Wales government fisheries info
 

rubra
Gastropods described in 1814